University Sinergija is a private university located in Bijeljina, Republika Srpska, Bosnia and Herzegovina.

References

Education in Bosnia and Herzegovina
Universities in Bosnia and Herzegovina
Educational institutions established in 2005
Serbian schools outside Serbia
2005 establishments in Bosnia and Herzegovina